Lowenfeld or Loewenfeld may refer to

 Claire Loewenfeld, German nutritionist and herbalist author of books on nutrition and growing herbs
 Helena Rosa Wright née Lowenfeld, British pioneer in family planning and sex therapy
 Henry Lowenfeld, Polish-born British entrepreneur, father of Helena and Margaret
 Julian Henry Lowenfeld, American poet, playwright, trial lawyer, composer, and translator
 Margaret Lowenfeld, British child psychologist and psychotherapist
 Viktor Lowenfeld, Austrian professor of art education